.қаз (abbreviation of ) is the Internet internationalized country code top-level domain (iccTLD) for Kazakhstan. It is used with web addresses using Cyrillic letters. It was launched in March 2012, when the first site, a test site ("test.qaz") was activated.

Own second level domains are allowed, but there are also the following standardized second-level domains:
 .мем.қаз – public sector organizations
 .бiл.қаз – education institutions
 .ком.қаз – commercial organizations
 .қау.қаз – non-profit organizations and projects
 .қор.қаз – defense
 .бай.қаз – communications enterprises, networks
Some second-level domains have been reserved in a prioritized manner, such as президент.қаз ("prezident.qaz"). Between May 1, 2012 to July 31, 2012, companies and trademark holders could apply for their names.

See also
 Communications in Kazakhstan
 Media of Kazakhstan
 Proposed top-level domain
 .kz
 .бг
 .бел
 .мкд
 .мон
 .рф
 .срб
 .укр

External links
 IANA .kz whois information

Notes

қаз
Internet in Kazakhstan